Zafrabad is a constituency of the Uttar Pradesh Legislative Assembly covering the city of Zafrabad in the Jaunpur district of Uttar Pradesh, India.

Zafrabad is one of five assembly constituencies in the Machhlishahr Lok Sabha constituency. Since 2008, this assembly constituency is numbered 371 amongst 403 constituencies.

Election results

2022

2017
Bharatiya Janta Party candidate Dr. Harendra Prasad Singh won in 2017 Uttar Pradesh Legislative Elections defeating Samajwadi Party candidate Sachindra Nath Tripathi by a margin of 24,865 votes.

References

External links
 

Assembly constituencies of Uttar Pradesh
Politics of Jaunpur district